Michael Robert Henry (born November 7, 1965) is an American actor, comedian, writer, and producer. He is known for his work on the animated sitcom Family Guy, where he was a writer and producer, as well as the voice of Cleveland Brown (until 2021), Herbert, Bruce, Consuela, The Greased-Up Deaf Guy, among others. Henry is also known for co-creating and starring in the spin-off The Cleveland Show (2009–2013), for which he voiced Cleveland Brown and Rallo Tubbs, among others. He is also known for his recurring role as Dann in the television series The Orville.

Early life and education
Henry was born in Pontiac, Michigan, on November 7, 1965, to artist parents and raised in Richmond, Virginia, with his younger brother Patrick. Their parents divorced when Henry was eight years old and the boys were primarily raised by their mother. He was awarded a scholarship and attended the nearby preparatory Collegiate School. Henry graduated from Washington and Lee University (1988) where he earned his B.A. in history and served as class president his sophomore-senior years. Although interested in comedy, Henry never believed he could make a career of it so instead opted for more "business stuff".

Career

Early career 
At 24, after a brief career in advertising, Henry moved to California to pursue acting. There he began taking classes at the Groundlings Theater and performing stand-up comedy. After three years in Los Angeles, Henry returned to Virginia to shoot short comedy films that he wrote and acted in. During that time, Henry often acted in his brother Patrick's student films at the Rhode Island School of Design, where he was introduced to his brother's college roommate, Seth MacFarlane. Henry recalled in 2018,  "We immediately hit it off and cracked each other up and kept in touch."

Henry later moved to New York City where he acted in commercials, studied improvisation at the Upright Citizens Brigade Theater and wrote, produced, starred-in and co-directed (with his brother Patrick) comedy shorts for Lorne Michaels’ Burly Bear Network.

Family Guy
Henry’s break came in 1998, when MacFarlane contacted him about being part of a new show called Family Guy. Mike agreed and joined the project as a writer and voice actor. Henry has stated that the inspiration for Cleveland's voice was based on "this guy that [he] had once played basketball with". During the show's first four seasons, he was credited as a guest star, but beginning with season five's "Prick Up Your Ears" he has been credited as a main cast member.

Two episodes into the second season, Family Guy was taken off the network's permanent schedule and shown irregularly thereafter. The show returned in March 2000 to finish airing the second season which contained 21 episodes; all the cast came back for the series return. During its second season, Fox publicly announced that the show had been cancelled. Despite the announced cancellation, in 2001 Fox decided to make the third season. During the third season, Fox announced that the show was canceled for good. Soon after Family Guy was cancelled, Henry and his brother created the popular web series Kicked in the Nuts!, a spoof of hidden camera shows. Family Guy was renewed again in 2005 for its fourth season due to strong DVD sales and its syndication on basic cable networks. Once again Henry and the rest of the cast came back for their voice works. In October 2017, Family Guy was renewed for its 16th season.

On June 26, 2020, after twenty-one years of voicing the character, Henry announced on Twitter that he was stepping down from voicing Cleveland, stating "persons of color should play characters of color." On September 25, 2020, it was announced that YouTube personality Arif Zahir, who is African-American, would replace Henry as Cleveland, but some episodes produced before Henry's departure from the role will still see Henry voicing the character. Speaking to Henry, who would continue to do other voices for the show, Zahir, who is a longtime fan of both the character and the show said, "you created something truly special, and I promise I will do my absolute best to honor your legacy." To the fans he said, "I promise not to let you down." Currently, there has been no word on a potential recasting of Consuela and Rallo Tubbs, two characters of color voiced by Henry on the series, leaving the future of their portrayals unclear.

The Cleveland Show
On September 27, 2009, The Cleveland Show premiered on Fox. The project was created and executive-produced by Henry, Seth MacFarlane and American Dad! show runner Rich Appel. The show focused on the Family Guy character Cleveland Brown, who referenced the spin-off at the end of the Family Guy episode "Baby Not on Board". The first season consisted of 22 episodes and was picked up by Fox for a second 13-episode season. The announcement was made on May 3, 2009 before the first season even premiered. Due to strong ratings, Fox picked up two additional nine-episode seasons, bringing the total episode count of the show to 44. The show was renewed for a third and fourth season on May 9, 2011. The series was canceled after its fourth season on May 19, 2013, but reruns continue to air on FXX in the United States and on Much in Canada. The series ran for a total of 4 seasons and 88 episodes.

Personal life
Henry married Linda Murray in 2002, they divorced in 2005 after three years of marriage. Together they have a son, named Jack. Henry has been married to his second wife Sara Voelker since 2007. Together they have a daughter, named Josie. Henry and Voelker currently reside in Henrico, Virginia.

Filmography

Film

Television

Web

Video games

References

External links
 
 
 

1965 births
Living people
American male comedians
American male film actors
American male screenwriters
American male television actors
American male voice actors
American male writers
American stand-up comedians
American television producers
Male actors from Richmond, Virginia
Primetime Emmy Award winners
Washington and Lee University alumni
20th-century American comedians
21st-century American comedians
20th-century American male actors
20th-century American writers